is a Japanese actress from Tokyo who has featured in productions for theatre, television, film and radio. Her mother is Seinenza Theater Company actress Atsuko Takahata and her brother-in-law is actor Yuta Takahata. Keiko Kitagawa is her third distant cousin.

Appearances

Stage
Kamogawa Horumo (May – June 2009, Kichijoji Theater, etc.) as Arisa Miyoshi
Suspender 7th Performance Yoru to Mori no  Munichhausen (September 2009, Mitaka City Arts and Culture Center) as Saki
tpt 73rd Performance Kirei Janakya Ikenai Wake (December 2009 – January 2010, Zamza Asagaya)
OneOr8 24th Performance Zetsumetsu no Tori (September – October 2010, Theatre Tram)
44 Produce Futsū no Seikatsu (Oct 2010, Kinokuniya Hall)
Habanera Produce Rosette (December 2010, Tokyo Metropolitan Theatre Small Hall 1) as Miharu
Komatsu-za 93rd Performance Nihonjin no heso (March 2011, Theatre Cocoon)
tpt 79th Performance Ō to Ko (September 2011, Ueno Storehouse)
Edo-ito Ayatsuri Ningyō-za Performance Caucasus no Hakuboku no Wa (January 2012, Traditional Hall) as Gurusha
KAAT Nippon Literature Miminashi Hōichi (April 2012, Kanagawa Arts Theatre)
ACM Theater Produce Performance Cash On Delivery (June 2012, Art Tower Mito)
Gekidan Tokyo Festival Awa (July 2012, Shimokitazawa Off Off Theater)
Takaha Theater Company Sekai o Oeru tameno, Kaigi (January 2013, Shimokitazawa Station Front Theater)
Chijinkai Shinsha 2nd Performance Nekko (April 2013, Akasaka RedTheater)
Meiji-za August Performance Tomoe Gozen (August 2013, Meiji-za)
2014 Theater Green Produce Nomuzu Project Second Performance Doshinbo no Hama (June 2014, Theater Green Box in Box Theater)

Films
The Spider's Thread (April 2013, Kaeru Cafe) as Oni

TV dramas
Mother Episode 6 (May 2010, NTV)
Getsuyō Golden Mitori no Isha: Bike Kāsan no Ōshin Nisshi (December 2011, TBS)
Tonbi Second Part (January 2012, NHK) as Reception woman
Suiyō Mystery 9 Kaigo Helper Murasakiame-ko no Jiken-bo (June 2012, TX) as Miyuki
Taiga drama Gunshi Kanbei (January 2014, NHK) as Okiku
Iyashi-ya Kiriko no Yakusoku (September 2015, THK) as Tamako/Lucy Tamaki

Radio
Seishun Adventure "Maiwa Densetsu" (May – June 2011, NHK-FM)

References

External links
 – Ameba Blog 
Kotomi Takahata – Talent Databank 

Japanese stage actresses
People from Tokyo
Nihon University alumni
1986 births
Living people